Rico Linhas Aéreas S/A was a Brazilian regional airline with its headquarters at Eduardo Gomes International Airport in Manaus, Brazil, authorized to operate scheduled passenger and cargo services in the Amazon region. The airline was grounded on 1 June 2010 and on 7 June 2011 lost its operational license. Current is a charter company.

History
Rico Linhas Aéreas was authorized to operate as a regional carrier in 1996 but its history is much older. In 1952, the Turkish immigrant Munur Yurtsever, known as Commander Mickey, who worked as an airplane mechanic in Nova Xavantina, Mato Grosso, bought an aircraft and started to fly in the region. The operations consisted of transportation of cargo to gold-mining locations of the region using small aircraft.

During the 1960s, Mickey started a small charter and air taxi company called Taxi Aéreo Rondônia, specialized in flying to gold-mining centers of Rondônia and headquartered in Porto Velho. During the construction of the Trans-Amazonian highway in the 1970s, the company changed its headquarters to Manaus, and provided air services to the big construction companies that were building the highway.

Later, Yurtsever also created Rico - Rondônia Indústria e Comércio, a company that in 1980 would be merged with Taxi Aéreo Rondônia to create Rico Taxi Aéreo.

From 1974 to 1982 Rico Taxi Aéreo maintained a contract with Petrobras to provide air-transportation while it was searching for oil and natural gas in the Amazonian region. At that time Rico operated 23 Douglas DC-3s being the largest private operator of this type of aircraft in the world.

On 1 November 1996, while maintaining its independent air taxi operations, the owners of Rico Táxi Aéreo created Rico Linhas Aéreas, a regional scheduled airline. In 2005 Rico Linhas Aéreas was the largest regional carrier in Brazil serving Acre, Amazonas, Pará, and Rondônia.

However the 2008 economic crisis forced Rico to dramatically downsize its operations: between January and September 2008, Rico cancelled 90% of its operations reducing its participation to 0.02% of the market, operating only within the state of Amazonas.

Rico Linhas Aéreas temporarily suspended all scheduled flights as of 1 June 2010 for a major operational restructuring. Charter operations however continued. On 7 June 2011 the National Civil Aviation Agency of Brazil cancelled its operational license but Rico Táxi Aéreo remains operative.

Destinations
In March 2010, before suspending its scheduled flights, Rico Linhas Aéreas operated services to the following destinations:

Borba – Borba Airport
Coari – Coari Airport
Manaus – Eduardo Gomes International Airport
Manicoré – Manicoré Airport
Maués – Maués Airport

Terminated destinations before the suspension of services:
Acre
Boca do Acre, Cruzeiro do Sul, Rio Branco, Tarauacá
Amazonas
Barcelos, Carauari, Eirunepé, Fonte Boa, Humaitá, Ipiranga, Lábrea, Novo Aripuanã, Parintins, Santa Isabel do Rio Negro, São Gabriel da Cachoeira, São Paulo de Olivença, Tabatinga, Tefé, Vila Bittencourt
Rondônia
Costa Marques, Guajará-Mirim, Porto Velho
Pará
Altamira, Belém-Val de Cans, Itaituba, Santarém

Fleet 
Rico Linhas Aéreas included the following aircraft configured in all-economy class as of June 2010:

Accidents and incidents
7 October 1978: Douglas C-47A PT-KVU of RICO Taxi Aéreo overran the runway on landing at Carlos Prates Airport, Belo Horizonte. All 19 people on board survived, but the aircraft was damaged beyond economic repair.
30 August 2002: flight 4823 operated by the Embraer EMB 120ER Brasília registration PT-WRQ, en route from Cruzeiro do Sul and Tarauacá to Rio Branco crashed on approach to Rio Branco during a rainstorm, 1.5 km short of the runway. Of the 31 passengers and crew aboard, 23 died.
14 May 2004: flight 4815 operated by the Embraer EMB 120ER Brasília registration PT-WRO, en route from São Paulo de Olivença and Tefé to Manaus crashed in the forest at about 18 nm from Manaus. All 33 passengers and crew died.

See also
List of defunct airlines of Brazil

References

External links
Rico Linhas Aéreas accidents on Aviation Safety Database

Defunct airlines of Brazil
Airlines established in 1996
Airlines disestablished in 2010